Miguel Alejandro Palacios Redorta (born 6 March 1981), commonly known as “Pikolin” is a Mexican former professional footballer who played as a goalkeeper most recently for Atlético San Luis in the Ascenso MX.

Career

Pumas UNAM

He joined UNAM at the age of 16, and was administered to Puma's youth sub-17 squad, as well as his twin brother Marco Antonio Palacios, a defender. Alejandro Palacios made his first division debut on May 17, 2003. Typically, Palacios has acted as back-up to veteran goalkeeper Sergio Bernal.

In August 2010 he saved a penalty in a 2–0 win against Cruz Azul.

International career
In February 2016, Palacios was called up by Mexico manager Juan Carlos Osorio for a friendly-international match against Senegal. Palacios was named in Mexico's provisional squad for Copa América Centenario but was cut from the final squad.

Honours

UNAM
 Mexican Primera División (4): 2004 Clausura, 2004 Apertura, 2009 Clausura, 2011 Clausura
Campeón de Campeones (1): 2004

See also
 List of one-club men

References

External links
 

1981 births
Living people
Footballers from Mexico City
Association football goalkeepers
Club Universidad Nacional footballers
Liga MX players
Twin sportspeople
Mexican twins
Mexican footballers